Catherine Hill (born September 6, 1946) is a retired French epidemiologist and biostatistician who worked at the Institut Gustave Roussy.

Biography
Hill was born Geneviève Catherine Oudin in the 14th arrondissement of Paris to François Oudin and Marie-Adélaïde Régnier. She is a graduate of lycée Marie Curie in Sceaux, Hauts-de-Seine before earning a master’s degree in math from the University of Paris, then a diploma of advanced studies (DEA) in logic and set theory from Henri Poincaré University.

In 1979-80, she was a visiting scholar at Harvard University.

Se has two children with pediatrician Harold Hill, her first husband.

Select publications
Méta-analyses en réseau : intérêt et limites en oncologie February 2016 Bulletin du Cancer 103(3) DOI:10.1016/j.bulcan.2016.01.003 
 Ribassin-Majed L, Hill C. Trends in tobacco-attributable mortality in France. Eur J Public Health. 2015 Oct;25(5):824-8. doi: 10.1093/eurpub/ckv078. Epub 2015 May 9. PMID: 25958238
 Bochen Cao, Catherine Hill, Christophe Bonaldi, Maria E León, Gwenn Menvielle, Pierre Arwidson, Freddie Bray, Isabelle Soerjomataram, Cancers attributable to tobacco smoking in France in 2015, European Journal of Public Health, Volume 28, Issue 4, August 2018, Pages 707–712, https://doi.org/10.1093/eurpub/cky077

References

External links
Article on French Wikipedia

French women epidemiologists
1946 births
Living people
Biostatisticians
Harvard University alumni
University of Paris alumni
French women non-fiction writers